Clavus sulekile is a species of sea snail, a marine gastropod mollusk in the family Drilliidae.

Description
The length of the shell attains .

Distribution
This marine species occurs off Mozambique and off KwaZulu-Natal, South Africa

References

Kilburn R.N. (1988). Turridae (Mollusca: Gastropoda) of southern Africa and Mozambique. Part 4. Subfamilies Drillinae, Crassispirinae and Strictispirinae. Annals of the Natal Museum. 29(1): 167–320. page(s): 190, figs 7, 97-100

External links

sulekile
Gastropods described in 1988